Lugones is a surname. Notable people with the surname include:

Jorge Rubén Lugones (born 1952), Argentine Roman Catholic bishop
Leopoldo Lugones (1874–1938), Argentine writer
Maria Lugones (1944–2020), Argentine philosopher
Mario C. Lugones (1912–1970), Argentine film director
Pirí Lugones (1925–1978), Argentine writer, granddaughter of Leopoldo